Eddystone may refer to:

Places 
Antarctica
 Eddystone Rocks (South Shetland Islands)

Australia
 Eddystone (Tasmania), off the south coast of Tasmania
 Eddystone Point, on the northeast coast of Tasmania

Falkland Islands
 Eddystone Rock, Falklands Islands

Solomon Islands
 Simbo, formerly Eddystone Island

United Kingdom
 Eddystone Rocks, Devon
 Eddystone Lighthouse, Devon

United States
 Eddystone, Pennsylvania
 Eddystone station, a SEPTA station
 New Eddystone Rock, Alaska

Other uses 
 Eddystone (Google)
 Eddystone Building, Detroit, Michigan
  – a ship launched at Hull in 1802 that was wrecked in 1843.
 Eddystone (HBC vessel), operated by the HBC from 1807 to 1823, see Hudson's Bay Company vessels
 Eddystone, an Armstrong Whitworth Ensign aircraft

See also